Kits may refer to:

Kitsilano, a neighbourhood of the city of Vancouver, British Columbia, Canada
Kits, an American taffy candy made by Gilliam Candy Company
KITS, a San Francisco, California radio station
Kottayam Institute of Technology & Science, a college in Pallickathode, India

See also
 Saint Kitts
 Kit's Coty, a small village in the English county of Kent
 Kit (disambiguation)
 KIT (disambiguation)
 Kitsune